Chetia mola is an endangered species of fish in the family Cichlidae. It is found in the Luongo River of Zaire.

See also
Luena River, Zambia

References

External links

FishBase
ADW

Chetia
Fish described in 1983